The 1958 Memorial Cup final was the 40th junior ice hockey championship of the Canadian Amateur Hockey Association. The George Richardson Memorial Trophy champions Ottawa-Hull Junior Canadiens an independent team in Eastern Canada competed against the Abbott Cup champions Regina Pats of the Saskatchewan Junior Hockey League in Western Canada. In a best-of-seven series, held at the Ottawa Auditorium in Ottawa, Ontario and at Hull Arena in Hull, Quebec, Ottawa-Hull won their 1st Memorial Cup, defeating Regina 4 games to 2.

Scores
Game 1: Regina 4-3 Ottawa-Hull
Game 2: Ottawa-Hull 4-2 Regina
Game 3: Ottawa-Hull 6-2 Regina
Game 4: Regina 4-3 Ottawa-Hull (OT)
Game 5: Ottawa-Hull 6-3 Regina
Game 6: Ottawa-Hull 6-1 Regina

Winning roster
Jon Annable, Ralph Backstrom, Jacques Begin, Bob Boucher, Bill Carter, Claude Cyr, Dick Dawson, Claude Fournel, Bruce Gamble, Terry Gray, John Longarini, Nick Murray, Bob Olajos, Claude Richard, Bobby Rousseau, Claude Ruel, Andre Tardif, Gilles Tremblay, J. C. Tremblay, Harold White.  Coach: Scotty Bowman

References

External links
 Memorial Cup 
 Canadian Hockey League

1957–58 in Canadian ice hockey
Memorial Cup tournaments
Ice hockey competitions in Ottawa